Pico/Aliso station is an at-grade light rail station on the L Line of the Los Angeles Metro Rail system. It is located in the median of East 1st Street between South Anderson Street and South Utah Street in the Boyle Heights neighborhood of Los Angeles. This station opened on November 15, 2009, as part of the Gold Line Eastside Extension.

During construction of the Regional Connector project west of this station, Pico/Aliso is currently serving as the northbound terminus of the southern portion of the L Line. At this station, passengers can transfer between trains and a bus bridge that serves the Little Tokyo/Arts District station area and Union Station's Patsaouras Transit Plaza, where passengers can board trains to continue on the northern portion of the L Line. This station and all the other Eastside Extension stations will be part of the E Line upon completion of the Regional Connector project in 2023.

Location 
Pico/Aliso station is located in the western part of the Boyle Heights neighborhood of eastern Los Angeles. The station is the first east of the Los Angeles River on the Gold Line Eastside Extension. Pico/Aliso lies in a low-density residential and industrial area. The Santa Ana Freeway, carrying US 101, acts as both a major transport artery in the area and the eastern border of the station precinct. The infamous Aliso Village neighborhood sat near the site of Pico/Aliso station but was demolished before the Gold Line extension opened.

Transit-oriented development 
One of the aims of the Gold Line extension is to encourage transit-oriented development around Metro stations. At Pico/Aliso, the most prominent development is the Pueblo del Sol public housing project to the northeast of the station.

Service

Station layout 
Pico/Aliso station utilizes a simple island platform setup with two tracks in the median of East 1st Street. There are two ramps for platform access, one at the intersection of South Utah Street and the other at the intersection of South Anderson Street.

Since October 24, 2020, Pico/Aliso station has served as a transfer point between trains and a bus bridge that serves the Little Tokyo/Arts District station area and Union Station's Patsaouras Transit Plaza, where passengers can board trains to continue on the northern portion of the L Line.

Hours and frequency

Connections 
, the following connections are available:
 Los Angeles Metro Bus: ,

Station art 
Like many other Metro stations, Pico/Aliso station contains a piece of public art. LACMTA chose Long Beach, California based artist Rob Neilson to create a piece for the station, which eventually became "About Face."

References

External links 

L Line (Los Angeles Metro) stations
Boyle Heights, Los Angeles
Eastside Los Angeles
Railway stations in the United States opened in 2009
2009 establishments in California